Richard David Rothstein was an American screenwriter and director. He is best known for the original screenplay Universal Soldier, which was followed by five sequels in 1998, 1999, 2009, 2012. He is the creator of the HBO TV series The Hitchhiker as well as the writer/director of many of the episodes. He has written many screenplays in the science fiction/horror genre and has had several graphic novels published. Rothstein died on April 16, 2018 at his home in Los Angeles.

Biography
Rothstein was born in Torrington, Connecticut and grew up on Long Island. He attended Syracuse University, graduated from New York University, and got a J.D. from Temple Law School. He practiced law in New York for two years before coming to Los Angeles. He and his wife, Bushra, a psychoanalyst, reside in Los Angeles and have three children, Sara, Joshua, and Jessie as well as four grandchildren.

Graphic novels
 Baron Von Frankenstein: A Hollywood Fairytale (2013): Viper Comics
 Space Circus (2013): Viper Comics
 Aussie (2014): Viper Comics

Filmography
Death Valley (1982): writer
Hard to Hold (1984): writer
Invitation to Hell (1984): writer
Bates Motel (1987): writer/director/executive producer
The Gifted One (1989): writer/executive producer
The Hitchhiker (1983–1991): writer/director/executive producer
Double Deception (1993): writer/executive producer
Universal Soldier (1992): writer/original screenplay
Universal Soldier II: Brothers in Arms (1998): characters
Universal Soldier III: Unfinished Business (1998): characters
Universal Soldier: The Return (1999): characters
Universal Soldier: Regeneration (2009): characters
Universal Soldier: Day of Reckoning (2012): characters

References

External links
 

2018 deaths
American male screenwriters